PBN Broadcasting Network, Inc. is a Philippine media network. Its corporate office is located at the 3rd floor, Eesan Bldg., #32 Quezon Ave., Quezon City.

History
It was established by George D. Bayona on October 24, 1958, when the people of Legazpi and the province of Albay had only heard radio from faint broadcast signals from Metro Manila stations. PBN pioneered the broadcast industry in the Bicol region by operating the first cable radio station, "Radyo Balagon", under the banner of Bicol Wire Broadcasting System (BWBS), the parent company of what PBN Broadcasting Network, Inc. is today.

At the height of its popularity, Radyo Balagon, as it was fondly called by its subscribers, initially served 3,000 households in Legazpi and the neighboring town of Daraga. With the continuous increase of subscribers, its area of coverage was expanded to the 1st district of Albay via a cable-relay station in the city of Tabaco.

With the success of Bicol Wire Broadcasting System (BWBS), and although technology was still in its infancy in the 60s, Bicol Wire Broadcasting System evolved into People's Broadcasting System (PBS) with the establishment of 1960 DZGB-AM, the pioneer commercial radio station in Legazpi.

DZGB proved to be the first of a string of AM stations. Subsequently, a sister station purely dedicated to news and music was opened and named DZGM, the first AM station to adopt an FM programming of less talk and more music. On June 24, 1970, DZMD-AM was inaugurated in Daet, Camarines Norte. Two years later, DZMS-AM started broadcasting in the Province of Sorsogon. The household name of People's Broadcasting System became People's Broadcasting Network (PBN) to reflect its founder's intent to serve its fellow Bicolanos region-wide.

The declaration of martial law on September 21, 1972, was the darkest moment in broadcast history. All radio and TV stations nationwide were shut down and PBN was among the casualties. DZGB Legazpi was immediately allowed to resume its broadcast operation one day after the shutdown order, followed by DZMD Daet, Camarines Norte two days later and DZMS Sorsogon after a week.

In 1987, 97.1 DWGB-FM Legazpi aired its maiden broadcast. Barely six months later, it made history when it dominated the local surveys as the most listened-to FM station in the area.

With the advent of the 90s, the network began to consider a move to television. Realizing the need for a national network with a strong programming capability, PBN entered into and became an affiliate of ABC 5 (now TV5). On March 3, 1995, PBN's dream of operating its own TV station became a reality. Its local TV shows took Naga City by storm, and other local networks found it a worthy competitor.

Inspired by the huge success of DWGB-FM in Legazpi City, PBN decided to open another FM station in a more competitive market - Naga, on July 3, 1995.

With the establishment of PBN TV 5 in Naga, it was just a matter of time before the second TV station was opened. In June 1995, PBN TV 6 was born in Legaspi. In the same year, People's Broadcasting Network changed its corporate name to PBN Broadcasting Network, Inc., with three AM stations, two FM stations and two television stations, strategically positioned in the key cities and provinces in the region that practically covers the entire Bicolandia.

PBN Stations

TV stations

Analog

Radio stations

AM station

FM stations

References

Television networks in the Philippines
Radio stations in the Philippines
Radio stations in Naga, Camarines Sur
TV5 Network
Mass media companies established in 1958
Radio stations established in 1958
Television channels and stations established in 1995
Philippine companies established in 1958